Robert B. Millman (August 25, 1939 – August 14, 2017), was an American physician and former Saul Steinberg Professor of Psychiatry and Public Health at Weill Cornell Medical College, where he was the Director of the Drug and Alcohol Abuse Treatment and Research Service at New York-Presbyterian Hospital.
He served in this role from 1987, until his retirement in 2009. Dr. Millman counseled and helped 
many people deal with and over come addiction from his office on east 35th
Street in New York. 
Millman was the author of more than 100 scientific papers and book chapters and an editor of the Comprehensive Textbook of Substance Abuse. He was a member of the Board of Directors of Drug Strategies, a national non-profit research institute that promotes effective drug abuse prevention, education, and treatment, and an advisor to the State and Federal Governments. He was the former Medical Director for Major League Baseball,  where he was an advisor on performance-enhancing supplements and steroids.

Millman graduated from Cornell and received his medical degree from the State University of New York, SUNY Downstate Medical Center in Brooklyn.  He was trained in internal medicine at the New York Hospital and Cornell Medical College and then in psychiatry at Cornell's Payne Whitney Psychiatric Clinic. He began his research career at the Rockefeller University, in the laboratory of Vincent Dole.

See also
 Acquired situational narcissism

References

1939 births
2017 deaths
American psychiatrists
Cornell University alumni
Researchers in alcohol abuse
Narcissism writers
SUNY Downstate Medical Center alumni
Physicians from New York (state)